Seesaw is a three-part British television crime drama, written by Deborah Moggach and directed by George Case, first broadcast on ITV on 12 March 1998. The series, based upon Moggach's own novel of the same name, stars David Suchet and Geraldine James as Morris and Val Price, an upper-middle class couple whose daughter, Hannah, is kidnapped and held to ransom for £500,000. Forced to sell everything they own to ensure the safe return of their daughter, Morris and Val are further shattered by the revelation that Hannah is pregnant with the kidnapper's baby.

Notably, Moggach altered the ending of Seesaw for the television production, claiming this was for "various reasons" and citing that as a complete piece, "the book in itself works better". For the television adaptation, Moggach continued her tradition of having a walk-on cameo in each of her productions, managing to break her own personal record by appearing six times through the three episodes as various different characters.

The series was later released on Region 1 DVD in the United States and Region 2 DVD in the Netherlands, although remains unreleased in the United Kingdom. When later re-broadcast on True Entertainment, the series was re-edited into two feature-length episodes.

Cast
 David Suchet as Morris Price
 Geraldine James as Val Price 
 Amanda Ooms as Eva 
 Neil Stuke as Jon
 Joanna Potts as Hannah Price 
 Jade Davidson	as Becky Price 
 Joseph Beattie as Theo Price 
 Chloe Tucker as Emma 
 Christopher Benjamin as Malcolm Green

Episodes

References

External links

1998 British television series debuts
1998 British television series endings
1990s British drama television series
1990s British television miniseries
Scottish television shows
ITV television dramas
Television shows produced by Scottish Television
English-language television shows
Television shows set in the United Kingdom